Gladding is a surname and may refer to:

 Charles Gladding (1828–1894), American co-founder of Gladding, McBean ceramics company
 Fred Gladding (1936 – 2015), American baseball player
 Jody Gladding, American translator and poet
 Monique Gladding (b. 1981), South African-born British diver